Of the 10 North Carolina incumbents, 8 were re-elected.

See also 
 List of United States representatives from North Carolina

1800
North Carolina
United States House of Representatives